Kwasi Dzidzornu  (1935 – March 13, 1993), also known as Rocky Dijon, was a Ghanaian percussionist known for his playing on recordings by The Rolling Stones, Nick Drake, Ginger Baker, Stevie Wonder, Billy Preston and Joe Walsh. During the 1970s he recorded extensively with Taj Mahal. Bill Wyman also enlisted him on his 1976 solo album Stone Alone.

War's drummer Harold Brown has named him as an important influence, and also credits him with teaching Ginger Baker.

Dzidzornu was born in Ghana, and escaped poverty there by stowing away on a boat for weeks with hardly any food and water to make his way to England. He was the father of six children, two sons, Kwaku and Gary, were both born in England and four daughters; Evonne, Jane, Norvi (deceased), and Awura. Producer Jimmy Miller brought him in to work with the Rolling Stones.

Critic Ned Sublette has written that the addition of his conga drumming on "Sympathy for the Devil" transformed the song from "a dirge, and a dull one at that . . . making it come alive".  He continued playing with The Rolling Stones through 1968, on tracks like "Stray Cat Blues", "Factory Girl" and "You Can't Always Get What You Want" and also participated in the same era on the Rock and Roll Circus event. In 1970 they used him again on "Can't You Hear Me Knocking".

Partial discography
68 Beggars Banquet (The Rolling Stones)
69 Five Leaves Left (Nick Drake)
69 Let It Bleed (The Rolling Stones)
70 The Road to Ruin (John and Beverley Martyn)
70 Ginger Baker's Air Force 2 (Ginger Baker's Air Force)
70 The Answer (Peter Bardens' Village)
71 Sticky Fingers (The Rolling Stones)
71 The Real Thing (Taj Mahal)
71 Happy Just to Be Like I Am (Taj Mahal)
74 Fulfillingness' First Finale (Stevie Wonder)
74 Perfect Angel (Minnie Riperton)
74 Mo' Roots (Taj Mahal)
75 Music Keeps Me Together (Taj Mahal)
75 It's My Pleasure (Billy Preston)
75 The Boys Don't Do It (Hugh Masekela)
76 Stone Alone (Bill Wyman)
76 You Can't Argue with a Sick Mind (Joe Walsh)
76 Music Fuh Ya' (Musica Para Tu) (Taj Mahal)
77 Brothers (Taj Mahal)
81 Magic Windows (Herbie Hancock)
98 Do What You Like (Ginger Baker)
09 Valleys of Neptune (Jimi Hendrix)

References

External links
 Rocky Dzidzornu at Discogs.com

British percussionists
Conga players
1935 births
1993 deaths
Ghanaian emigrants to the United Kingdom
20th-century drummers